El Salheya is a city in the Sharqia Governorate, Egypt.

History
On his way back to Cairo after the Battle of Ain Jalut, Sultan of Egypt Qutuz was assassinated in El Salheya. The region also witnessed the Battle of Salheyeh on 10 August 1798, during the French campaign in Egypt and Syria.

References

Populated places in Sharqia Governorate